Sıt is the Turkish word for archaeological site. The governmental committees named Cultural Assets Conservation Committees determine the archaeological sites. As of 2015 there were 14861 sit areas in Turkey. With a history including Hittites, Hellenistic Age, Roman and Byzantine Empires, Seljuks and the Ottoman Empire, Turkey is full of archaeological sites  Below is the number of Sıt areas in Turkey classified according to the Turkish provinces (il).

Examples

References

Archaeological sites in Turkey
Turkey history-related lists